Cody Ledbetter (July 9, 1973 – September 5, 2015) was an American football player.  He played college football for the New Mexico State Aggies football team in 1991 and from 1993 to 1995.  As a senior in 1995, he led all NCAA major college players in total offense yards (3,724), passing attempts (453), and interceptions (20).

Ledbetter later played in the Canadian Football League as a backup quarterback for the Edmonton Eskimos in 1996 and the Hamilton Tiger-Cats from 1998 to 2001.

He fled from Texas back to Canada while on probation for having an improper relationship with a student while he was a teacher, and awaiting sentencing in a similar case. He was eventually extradited back to Texas in 2010 and sentenced to 12 years. He was paroled 18 months later and died on September 5, 2015 in a suicide in Aledo, Texas. He left behind his wife and two step-children.

See also
 List of NCAA major college football yearly total offense leaders

References

1973 births
2015 suicides
American football quarterbacks
Canadian football quarterbacks
American players of Canadian football
Edmonton Elks players
New Mexico State Aggies football players
Hamilton Tiger-Cats players
High school football coaches in Texas
People from Stephenville, Texas
Players of American football from Texas
Suicides by hanging in Texas